Mpanjaka collenettei is a moth of the family Erebidae first described by Paul Griveaud in 1974. It is found in central Madagascar.

It has a wingspan of 35 mm and the length of the forewings is 17 mm.

See also
 List of moths of Madagascar

References

Lymantriinae
Moths of Madagascar
Moths described in 1974